Partula is a genus of air-breathing tropical land snails, terrestrial pulmonate gastropod mollusks in the family Partulidae. 

Many species of Partula are known under the general common names "Polynesian tree snail" and "Moorean viviparous tree snail". Partulids are distributed across  of Pacific Ocean islands, from the Society Islands to New Guinea.

Once used as decorative items in Polynesian ceremonial wear and jewelry, these small snails (averaging about one-half to three-quarters of an inch in length) gained the attention of science when Dr. Henry Crampton (along with Yoshio Kondo) spent 50 years studying and cataloging partulids, detailing their remarkable array of morphological elements, ecological niches, and behavioral aspects that illustrate adaptive radiation.

Decline
The partulids of the island of Tahiti act as an example of the possible deleterious effects of attempted biological control. After an infestation of the introduced giant African land snails (Achatina spp.), the carnivorous Florida rosy wolfsnail (Euglandina rosea) was introduced into Tahiti in an attempt to combat the African species.

The wolfsnail chose instead to hunt and eat members of the nearly 76 species of Partula that were endemic to Tahiti and the nearby islands, devouring all but 12 species in a decade. Several scientists recognized what was going on, and were able to save 12 species prior to their becoming extinct.

Today, the Zoological Society of London runs the Partula Programme Consortium which maintains a captive-breeding programme in the United Kingdom, France, and the United States.

The 2008 IUCN Red List of Threatened Species contains 15 critically endangered, 11 extinct in the wild, and 48 extinct Partula species. The IUCN Red List of Threatened Species version 2009.2 contains 13 critically endangered, 11 extinct in the wild and 51 extinct Partula species. The IUCN Red List of Threatened Species version 2015-4 contains 83 Partula species.

Species
Species within the genus Partula include:

 Partula affinis Pease, 1868
 Partula arguta† (Pease, 1866)
 Partula assimilis Pease, 1868
 Partula atilis† Crampton, 1956
 Partula auraniana Hartman, 1888 
 Partula aurantia† Crampton, 1932
 Partula auriculata† Broderip, 1832
 Partula bilineata† Pease, 1866
 Partula clara Pease, 1866
 Partula clarkei† Gerlach, 2016
 Partula compressa Reeve, 1850
 Partula cootei† Gerlach, 2016
 Partula cramptoni Clench, 1941
 Partula crassilabris† Pease, 1866
 Partula cuneata † Crampton, 1956
 Partula cytherea† C. M. Cooke & Crampton, 1930
 Partula dentifera† L. Pfeiffer, 1853
 Partula desolata† Bauman & Kerr, 2013
 Partula diminuta C. B. Adams, 1851
 Partula dolichostoma† Crampton, 1956
 Partula dolorosa† Crampton, 1956
 Partula emersoni Pilsbry, 1913
 Partula eremita† Crampton & C. M. Cooke, 1953
 Partula faba† (Gmelin, 1791)
 Partula filosa† L. Pfeiffer, 1853 synonym of Partula diminuta C. B. Adams, 1851)
 Partula flexuosa Hartman, 1885
 Partula formosa† Garrett, 1884: synonym of Partula dentifera L. Pfeiffer, 1853
 Partula garretti† Pease, 1865

 Partula gibba Férussac, 1821
 Partula grisea Lesson, 1831
 Partula guamensis† (L. Pfeiffer, 1846)
 Partula hebe (L. Pfeiffer, 1846)
 Partula hyalina Broderip, 1832
 Partula incrassa Crampton, 1916
 Partula jackieburchi†  (Y. Kondo, 1981)
 Partula labrusca† Crampton & C. M. Cooke, 1953
 Partula laevigata L. Pfeiffer, 1857
 Partula lanceolata C. M. Cooke & Crampton, 1930
 Partula langfordi Y. Kondo, 1970
 Partula leefei E. A. Smith, 1897
 Partula leptochila† Crampton, 1956
 Partula levistriata† Crampton, 1956
 Partula lugubris Pease, 1865
 Partula lutaensis Sischo & Hadfield, 2021
 Partula lutea† Lesson, 1831
 Partula magistri† Gerlach, 2016
 Partula makatea† Gerlach, 2016
 Partula martensiana Pilsbry, 1909: synonym of Partula rufa Lesson, 1831
 Partula meyeri J. B. Burch, 2007
 Partula micans L. Pfeiffer, 1853
 Partula mirabilis Crampton, 1924
 Partula mooreana Hartman, 1880
 Partula navigatoria (L. Pfeiffer, 1849)
 Partula nodosa L. Pfeiffer, 1853
 Partula obesa Pease, 1868
 Partula otaheitana (Bruguière, 1792)
 Partula pacifica L. Pfeiffer, 1855
 Partula pearcekellyi Gerlach, 2016

 Partula planilabrum† Pease, 1864
 Partula producta† Pease, 1864
 Partula protracta† Crampton, 1956
 Partula pyramis Hartman, 1886 
 Partula radiolata (L. Pfeiffer, 1846)
 Partula radiosa (L. Pfeiffer, 1854)
 Partula recluziana Petit de la Saussaye, 1850
 Partula remota† Crampton, 1956
 Partula rosea Broderip, 1832
 Partula rustica† Pease, 1866: synonym of Partula garrettii Pease, 1865
 Partula sagitta† Crampton & C. M. Cooke, 1953
 Partula salifana† Crampton, 1925
 Partula similaris Hartman, 1886
 Partula suturalis  L. Pfeiffer, 1855
 Partula taeniata (Mörch, 1850)
 Partula thalia† Garrett, 1884: synonym of Partula garrettii Pease, 1865
 Partula tohiveana Crampton, 1924
 Partula tristis Crampton & C. M. Cooke, 1953
 Partula turgida† (Pease, 1865)
 Partula umbilicata† Pease, 1866
 Partula vanikorensis (Quoy & Gaimard, 1832)
 Partula varia Broderip, 1832

Cladogram
A cladogram showing the phylogenic relationships of the genus Partula:

Ecology
Partula species on Tahiti were usually found on the undersides of the leaves of Caladium and plantain, although in some valleys, they were frequently found on Dracaena and turmeric.

References
This article incorporates public domain text from the reference.

Further reading
 Crampton H. E. (1916). Studies on the variation, distribution and evolution of the genus Partula. The species inhabiting Tahiti. Carnegie Institution of Washington, 228: 1-311.
 Crampton H. E. (1925). Studies on the variation, distribution and evolution of the genus Partula. The species of the Mariana Islands, Guam and Saipan. Carnegie Institution of Washington, 228a: 1-116.
 Crampton H. E. (1932). Studies on the variation, distribution and evolution of the genus Partula. The species inhabiting Moorea. Carnegie Institution of Washington, 410: 1-335.

External links 
 Partula evolution, diversity and conservation Partula Pages

 
Gastropod genera
Molluscs of Oceania
Molluscs of the Pacific Ocean